Cappelli & Company is an American children's television series created by, and starring, children's songwriter/composer Frank Cappelli. The series was in production for four and a half seasons, from 1989 to 1992, originating from Pittsburgh ABC affiliate WTAE-TV.

Upon the program's instant success both critically and ratings-wise in Pittsburgh, Cappelli & Company was distributed by WTAE's parent owner Hearst Television to air on all its sister stations across the country. Other Hearst-owned stations which aired the show well into the 1990s included WCVB in Boston, WDTN in Dayton, KMBC in Kansas City, WISN in Milwaukee, WBAL in Baltimore, and KCRA in Sacramento.

Synopsis
Cappelli & Company featured musical segments, puppets, montages, in studio sing-alongs with an audience of kids, and a variety of human interest pieces. Cappelli would usually play a role in most musical segments, which were taped in locations away from the show's main set. These segments featured original songs by Cappelli, ranging from the lighthearted "Brusha-Brusha Brush Your Teeth" to the more sentimental "Lindsay's Bakery". Various children would appear in necessary roles to help illustrate the actions/stories of each song. Depending on the segment, an influx of other adult actors would appear. The main studio segments would have Cappelli leading sing-alongs with the young audience, while playing his acoustic guitar. Guests of versatile talents would also join Cappelli and the kids in studio. Each episode would feature one human interest segment, such as a look inside a candy manufacturing company to see how its products are made (à la the "Picture Picture" segment of Mister Rogers' Neighborhood).

Cappelli & Company'''s furthered success on the Hearst family of stations led to cable kids' giant Nickelodeon picking up reruns of the show for its Monday-Friday morning Nick Jr. lineup. Its airtime on Nick began on April 5, 1993 and ended on June 10, 1994. While all Hearst stations continued to run Cappelli & Company after it went out of production in 1992 (once a week on Saturday mornings), the series' flagship station WTAE ran it the longest. In the fall of 2003, after a 14 year-run, the last 10 which had been entirely of reruns, the show was removed from WTAE's Saturday morning schedule. Most Hearst stations had only run the program until the late 1990s, while later stations acquired by the merger with Argyle Television never carried it at all.

While enjoying a great run on broadcast and cable television, Cappelli & Company'' won two Emmys for quality children's programming and two national Gabriel Awards for children's television. Cappelli also was signed by A&M Records as one of their national recording artists and released six audio cassettes and two video cassettes, partially based on this series. Both the audios and videos have been honored with numerous Parent Choice Awards.

Episodes

Season 1 (1989–90)

Season 2 (1990)

Season 3 (1991)

Season 4 (1991–92)

See also

List of local children's television series

References

American children's musical television series
1980s American children's television series
1990s American children's television series
1980s American music television series
1990s American music television series
1989 American television series debuts
1992 American television series endings
Local children's television programming in the United States
American television shows featuring puppetry
Television shows set in Pittsburgh